Hazel Simmons-McDonald (born 1947) is a St. Lucian writer and linguist. She is known for her work as a professor and administrator at the University of the West Indies, as well as her poetry, which has been published in periodicals, anthologies, and the 2004 collection Silk Cotton and Other Trees.

Early life and education 
Hazel Simmons-McDonald was born in St. Lucia in 1947. Her uncle was Harold Simmons, often referred to as the father of modern St. Lucian arts and culture.

She studied at the University of the West Indies in Jamaica, graduating in 1972 with a degree in education, with a special focus on English. She then attended Stanford University in the United States, where in the 1980s she obtained two master's degrees, in international development of education and linguistics, followed by a Ph.D. in applied linguistics.

Career

Academia 
After graduating from Stanford, Simmons-McDonald taught linguistics there before heading to the University of the West Indies at Cave Hill in Barbados in 1991. She served as both a professor and an administrator at the university, eventually becoming head of the linguistics department and then dean of the Faculty of Humanities and Education. From 2006 to 2008, she led the Society for Caribbean Linguistics as president of the organization.

In 2007, Simmons-McDonald became pro-vice chancellor and principal of the University of the West Indies Open Campus. She retired from her work at the university in 2014.

Her work included research on Creole languages in education and writing instructional texts for native speakers of Antillean Creole. She also co-edited the university's literary magazine, Poui, the Cave Hill Literary Annual.

As an emeritus professor, she has helped oversee and review the exams given by the Caribbean Examinations Council.

Writing 
Simmons-McDonald has written both academic works on linguistics in education and works of poetry. She has published both poems and fiction in periodicals including The Malahat Review, The Literary Review, Poui, Calabash, and BIM.

She co-edited the educational anthologies A World of Poetry and A World of Prose with Mark McWatt in 1994 and for subsequent editions.

Her first collection of poems, titled Silk Cotton and Other Trees, was published in 2004. Her poem "Parasite" appeared in the Oxford Book of Caribbean Verse the following year.

Simmons-McDonald's poetry is sometimes characterized by Christian themes.

Recognition 
In 2011, Simmons-McDonald was named an officer of the Order of the British Empire for "services to education and educational leadership."

Selected works

Education 

 A World of Poetry (1994)
 A World of Prose (1994)
 Writing in English : A Coursebook for Caribbean Students (1997)
 Exploring the Boundaries of Caribbean Creole Languages (2006)
 Education Issues in Creole and Creole-Influenced Vernacular Contexts (2014)

Poetry 

 Silk Cotton and Other Trees (2004)

References 

1947 births
Saint Lucian women writers
Saint Lucian women poets
Saint Lucian educators
Women linguists
University of the West Indies alumni
Stanford University alumni
University of the West Indies academics
Living people